Tasneem Roc (born 11 December 1978) is an Australian television and film actress born in Sydney.

Early life and education
Roc's mother, author Margaret Roc, is from Scotland and her father, John Roc, is a Karen from Burma. Her brother is James Roc.

Roc attended Turramurra High School and went on to study acting at the Australian Theatre for Young People. She graduated from the University of Sydney.

Career
Roc began her career on the Australian television series Heartbreak High in season six as activist high school student Thania Saya.

Roc then appeared in a guest role on ABC series Head Start as Skye Quinn, the disruptive daughter of Garrett Quinn. She appeared as a guest on UK Sky TV football series Dream Team as home-wrecking US professional tennis player Shannon Eden-Childs. She also appeared as victim of crime Tina Chang in a guest role on ABC TV's legal dramedy Crownies.

Roc appeared in the award-winning SBS mini-series East West 101 as Amina Malik, a role for which she learnt some Arabic, and Islamic prayers as the wife of Muslim detective Zane Malik. The cast was presented with the award for Outstanding Performance by an Ensemble Cast at the 2012 Equity Awards.

Roc appeared as British journalist Stephanie Murdoch in Kath & Kimderella, a film based on the hit TV comedy series Kath & Kim.

Roc appeared in Reef Doctors the Australian drama produced by Jonathan M. Shiff that premiered on Network Ten 9 June 2013. The show stars Lisa McCune as Sam Stewart the leader of a team of doctors serving the remote Hope Island Clinic on the Great Barrier Reef. Roc played nurse practitioner Olivia Shaw.

Roc appeared as Yael in Josh Lawson's debut comedy The Little Death and in the Seven Network miniseries Winter starring Rebecca Gibney and Peter O'Brien.

Roc most recently appeared as Nerissa on Mako: Island of Secrets.

Filmography

Film

Television

References

External links 

 

Living people
1978 births
Actresses from Sydney
Australian television actresses
Australian people of Karen descent
Australian people of Scottish descent
University of Sydney alumni
Australian people of Burmese descent
Australian people of Anglo-Burmese descent
21st-century Australian actresses